The Nikitin NV-1 was a single-seat sporting aircraft produced in the USSR in 1933.

Development
Whilst working under Grigorovich and Polikarpov, as well as at the TsKB (Central Construction Bureau) and OKB-30, Nikitin designed and built aircraft that carried his name despite not having an OKB. Inspired by racing aircraft in the US, Nikitin designed and built the NV-1 tailwheeled monoplane sporting aircraft. The wooden wing was braced to the fuselage and fixed spatted main undercarriage with streamlined steel struts. The fuselage was built up with welded steel tubing and  a duralumin tail unit, all covered with fabric.
The flying controls were operated by push-pull rods throughout.

Flight testing began in September 1933 by V.P.Chkalov. Chkalov reported that the NV-1 was difficult to fly, and after nine flights further work was abandoned.

Specifications (NV-1)

See also

References

 Gunston, Bill. "Encyclopedia of Russian Aircraft 1875–1995". London:Osprey. 1995.

External links
 https://web.archive.org/web/20110608223658/http://www.ctrl-c.liu.se/misc/RAM/nv-1.html
 https://web.archive.org/web/19991004085143/http://www.aviation.ru/Nikitin/

Soviet and Russian sport aircraft
1930s Soviet sport aircraft
Nikitin aircraft